Finding Dispersed Families is a special live broadcast created and aired by the Korean Broadcasting System (KBS) from June 30 to November 14, 1983. The television program aimed to reunite Korean families that had been separated following the Cold War and the Korean War as a result of the partition of the Korean Peninsulas. The broadcast was initially filmed at the KBS Headquarters in Yeouido Park in Seoul yet later expanded nationwide and featured cases received from nine of KBS' regional branches.

The program was conceived by director Park Hee-ung to pay homage to the 30th anniversary of the agreement to a ceasefire that brought an end to the Korean War. It was initially pitched as a small segment to be featured on the morning show Studio 830 with the title I Still Haven't Found my Family. Shortly following this pitch, however, KBS received a large number of applications to appear on the program, alerting the producers to the significant number of Korean families dispersed by war and their continued suffering. As a result, KBS president Lee Won-hong granted permission for an extended special broadcast to be aired, which led to the creation of the program.

Whilst the broadcast was originally planned with a duration of 95 minutes, it ran for a total of 453 hours and 45 minutes over 138 days as KBS was inundated with requests for help to re-connect individuals with their lost family members. As a result, 53,000 people were featured on air, uniting 10,000 families over its course.

Finding Dispersed Families received international acclaim and humanitarian praise, cementing its place in UNESCO's Memory of the World Register in 2015. The archives of the program can be accessed by the public via the KBS website or through searching using key words on any Korean portal site. Segments of the broadcast are also available for streaming with English subtitles on Vimeo and YouTube.

Background 
There were two key stages in Korean history in which significant numbers of families were separated, many of whom later appeared on the Finding Dispersed Families broadcast. These eras were the Liberation period (1945–1950) following the Cold War and the Korean War period (1950–1953).

The Cold War 
The division of the Korean peninsula into its North and South states resulted in the separation of over 10 million families and can be viewed as a consequence of the Cold War. After Japan brought an end to the 500-year rule by the Yi Dynasty, Korea experienced 35 years of Japanese colonial rule. This inspired nationwide attempts at independence, which ultimately failed on March 1, 1919. As a result of these failed movements, the nation split into those who turned to the Bolshevik Revolution and Marxism for a solution and those who believed the Western powers, especially the United States, would be able to provide relief. Following Japan's defeat in 1945, the Korean peninsula split along the 38th parallel into Soviet and American zones of occupation. This division was formally constructed in 1948, when the Republic of Korea was established in the South below the 38th parallel through a United Nations sponsored election. As a result, there was a significant influx of North Korean refugees to the southern peninsula and families separated across the states experienced difficulties maintaining communication.

The Korean War 
The Korean War further cemented the segregation between the North and South peninsula as political tensions heightened. The three-year conflict, beginning when the North Korean troops entered South Korea on June 25, 1950, set the communist and capitalist forces against each other. Over the course of the war, an estimated 3–4 million people were killed, with as many as 70% of these being civilians. To recognise the major role the Korean War played in separating families, the Finding Dispersed Families program was aired in recognition of the 33rd anniversary of the war's commencement (June 25, 1950) and the 30th anniversary of the armistice agreement (July 27, 1953).

Production and broadcasting

Finding participants 

Advertising to appear on KBS' broadcast special Finding Dispersed Families went live on June 26, 1983 with an original plan to air 200 stories on the program. Within two days, over 1000 applications were received, leading producers to make the decision that 850 people would be featured on the broadcast. In an attempt to increase the broadcast's success in re-connecting families, these applicants went through a series of interviews and were later assigned into four groups based on the likelihood that they would be reunited with their family. Those with the highest likelihood of reunion presented their cases first on the program. To feature all 850 applicants selected, each individual shared their case to find their missing family member through holding up a sign that featured a number and their story. On the first day of the program, 36 Koreans were reunited with their long-lost family members. Within days later, the walls of the KBS building as well as neighbouring sidewalks and the Yeouido Plaza were covered with posters looking for separated relatives. Due to the build up of such large crowds, the police were called to maintain order and safety amongst civilians. As the broadcast continued, the plaza remained full with citizens wanting to feature on the broadcast and thus, the "Finding Dispersed Families Headquarters" was established at the KBS main building. The secondary part of the live broadcast began on July 1, 1983 at 10:15 p.m. KST and marked the start of the 138 days of live broadcasting that followed.

Production 
To carry out the broadcast successfully, KBS employed 1641 broadcasting experts at a corporate level. Journalists from 25 nations delivered reunion news in front of the KBS lobby and KBS installed 24 television sets inside and outside the building to help Korean civilians stay up to date with the program. Whilst over 100,952 people applied to appear on the program, only 53,536 cases were aired. Of these participants, 10,189 families were reunited.  At its peak, the broadcast received a viewing rate of 78% with 4,943,118 people watching the campaign. The broadcast ended at 4:00 a.m. KST on November 14, 1983, however it continues to be streamed to this day through access via the KBS archives.

Reception

Significance 
 
The national significance of the Finding Dispersed Families program is reflected by the impact it had on the Korean people. The television program marked the first time mass media was used to aid in the process of post-war reunification and has the widest breadth of public participation of any Korean broadcast. Further, the program was key in continued communication between North and South Korea, as South Korea used the program as a bargaining tool in their efforts to re-open discussions with the North on reuniting families across the demilitarised zone. As a result, the Red Cross facilitated talks on the issue of reunification in 1971, however, the North terminated this channel of communication in 1973.

Despite this, the Finding Dispersed Families program holds great global significance in publicising the lesser-known consequences of the Cold War and Korean War. In an era where widespread access to television had only just began, the Finding Dispersed Families program became one of the first vivid records of the consequences of war on civilians. The program revealed to the world the issue of national division, featuring scenes of crowds of people gathering outside Yeoudio Plaza in an effort to find their lost family members. The raw emotions of Korean civilians captured by the live broadcast gathered an emotive response across the globe. This is reflected by the U.N secretary General Javier Perez de Cuellar meeting with the Korean Ambassador of the United Nations, Kim Kyuong-won, on July 21, 1983 to express his sympathy for the tragedy. The program's impact on the global community is further shown by the fact that it was broadcast by 25 countries in real time as well as being screened at the general assembly of the Asia-Pacific Broadcasting Union in Auckland, New Zealand in October 1983. Global politicians were also responsive to the broadcast, with 17 members from 7 countries visiting the KBS headquarters alongside the directors of the International Human Rights Commission during the 70th Assembly of the Inter-Parliamentary Union. The program was also a popular topic in International newspapers, with the New York Times writing a review of the broadcast in August 1983.

Airing 
Finding Dispersed Families's continued relevance is reflected by its legacy in global history. The broadcast has received numerous awards since its airing, listed in the table below. The most noteworthy of these is the program's recognition by the UNESCO International Advisory Committee of its historical value, leading to its place in the Memory of the World Register. 

The program's legacy is also highlighted by the reunions that have continued in North and South Korea since the Finding Dispersed Families program. The broadcast's success in re-uniting family members and the continued appeals by the Korean Public for the opportunity to find their long-lost relatives inspired other television companies to continue KBS’ efforts. This is seen through the program "Reunions of Separated Families for Sakhalin-Koreans", which aired in the 1990s. KBS also continued to involve themselves in aiding re-unions, featuring a regular segment "I miss them (그 사람이 보고싶다)", on the morning show Achim Madang from 1997 to 2007. Re-union efforts continue to play an important role in North and South Korea, being predominantly driven by the Korean Red Cross and the North and South Korean Governments. The most recent of these reunion efforts was the "Inter-Korean Family Reunions", which occurred in August 2018.

Streaming availability 
The archives of the program are considerably detailed, including 463 videotapes featuring 453 hours and 45 minutes of live broadcast organised by date of production. The archives, however, extend past these original recordings and also include files produced by the Korean Broadcasting System relating to the planning process, including director's notes and storyboards, as well as notes on production. Further, the archives include related documents published by the South Korean Government and local council organisations as well as those published by national newspapers. In particular, the archive has collected 12 volumes of the register of names of those featured on the program produced by the Korean Red Cross as well as the music used in the program. This includes the theme song, "The Lost Thirty Years" and the background music, "Does Anyone know this Person?".  The archives also feature 15,000 photographic records, including photos of reunions taken in the studio and those commissioned by KBS.

The archives of the program are readily available to the public on the KBS’ website. This website allows users to stream the broadcasts as well as access a large collection of all related material, such as the stories of the participants and photographs of their reunions. More recently, a data base has been created featuring the names and details of all Korean civilians featured on the program in an effort to match these to the broadcast they are featured in to allow for quick searches of footage using the participants name.

References 

Korean Broadcasting System original programming
Memory of the World Register